The City of Memphis was a  passenger train route operated by the Nashville, Chattanooga and St. Louis Railway connecting Nashville's Nashville Union Station and Memphis, Tennessee's Memphis Union Station.

History 
The City of Memphis was powered by one of the last steam locomotives ever streamlined. The six cars were all rebuilt and streamlined by the NC&StL shops from heavyweight cars. The six cars were originally Pullman Heavyweight Parlor Cars before purchase by the NC&STL for conversion to coaches in June 1941.

The train set operated a daily round trip and lasted beyond the 1957 Louisville and Nashville Railroad takeover of the NC&StL, although the name was removed from the service by 1955.

Equipment 

To equip the train the railroad rebuilt six heavyweight Pullman parlor cars. The resulting train consisted of a baggage-mail car, a coach-dinette-lounge, two 56-seat coaches, a dining-tavern car, and a coach-lounge-observation car.

Notes

References

External links 
 1950 timetable

North American streamliner trains
Passenger trains of the Nashville, Chattanooga and St. Louis Railway
Passenger rail transportation in Tennessee
Named passenger trains of the United States
Railway services introduced in 1947
Railway services discontinued in 1958